Coleophora tringella is a moth of the family Coleophoridae. It is found in southern Russia, Kazakhstan and Turkey. It occurs in desert-steppe and desert biotopes.

Adults are on wing from late May to June.

The larvae feed on Kochia prostrata. They feed on the generative organs of their host plant.

References

tringella
Moths of Europe
Moths of Asia
Moths described in 1988